Central Bosnian culture was a Bronze and Iron Age cultural group. This group, which ranged over the areas of the upper and mid course of the rivers Vrbas (to Jajce) and Bosna (to Zenica, but not including the Sarajevo plain), constituted an independent cultural and ethnic community. Typical of this group are hillfort-type settlements located close to the major areas of cultivable land, with a high standard of housing. Around 120 hilforts belonging to this culture were identified in the area of Central Bosnia. This group is commonly associated with the later Illyrian tribe of Daesitiates.

Periodization 
Central Bosnian culture coexisted with Glasinac culture. One of the most significant sites of this group is Fortress Pod in Bugojno which was declared as national monument of Bosnia and Herzegovina. Stratified material found in Pod as well as other fortified settlements helped define this cultural group of late Bronze Age. Archaeologist identified 7 phases of this cultural group. Phase 1 was from middle of 11th to 8th century BC and Phase 2 was from 750/725 until 625/650 BC. Phases 3 and 4 that lasted from 625/650 till 450 BC were characterized by big fortifications like those in Lašva, Kiseljak and in Sarajevo field. This period is marked by increased use of iron. These period saw development of fortress Pod and Debelo Brdo which were important factor in the economy of wider area.

From 450 to 300 BC pottery mainly retained its style, but there is influence from Glasinac culture and early Celtic types of jewelry, buckles, rings and other items. This was a result of increased trading connections between the valleys of rivers Bosna and Vrbas to Pannonian plain and also between the valley of Neretva that was open to Adriatic Sea. Final phase laster from 3 to 1 BC that saw rapid shift to incineration of the dead. Necropolis Kamenjača in Breza contained urns and other items from Central Bosnian culture, but also Celtic and Hellenistic artifacts. There is possibility that Kamenjača was a cult place.

Artifacts 
Pottery had characteristic Western Balkan geometric style of late Bronze Age. It is characterized with strict symmetry and abstract art. There are numerous artifacts pointing to developed metallurgy. This culture had access to copper, gold, lead, silver and iron ore in Central Bosnia.

Right up until the beginning of 3rd century BC burial of the dead was common practice as evidenced by Warriors tomb in Vratnica, Visoko from 4th century.

See also  

 Illyrians
 Pod 
 Glasinac culture
 Early history of Bosnia and Herzegovina

Sources 

 Andrijana Pravidur, "Prilog poznavanju metalurških središta željeznodobnih naselja Srednje Bosne u svijetlu novih istraživanja" (A contribution to the knowledge of the metallurgical centers of the Iron Age settlements of central Bosnia) – National Museum of Bosnia and Herzegovina, Sarajevo, 2011

References

External links 

 Early Iron Age in Central Bosnia – an overview and research perspectives (2018)

Bronze Age cultures of Europe
Archaeological cultures in Bosnia and Herzegovina
Prehistory of Southeastern Europe
Iron Age Bosnia and Herzegovina
Iron Age cultures of Europe
Illyrians
Illyrian Bosnia and Herzegovina